Lake Claiborne is a reservoir located near the town of Homer, Louisiana, United States. Lake Claiborne State Park, a Louisiana state maintained camping and recreation area, lies on southern shore of the lake. The state park also offers two world class disc golf courses.

The lake was created by the construction of Clairborne Lock and Dam by the United States Army Corps of Engineers in 1970.  The lock is for water management and navigation; no hydroelectric power is produced here.  The dam was built during the terms of Governors Jimmie Davis and John McKeithen.

References

External links
Lake Claiborne State Park

Claiborne, Lake
Bodies of water of Claiborne Parish, Louisiana
Dams in Louisiana
United States Army Corps of Engineers dams